WADB (1310 AM) is a country music radio station serving the southern Monmouth and northern Ocean county area of New Jersey. Licensed to Asbury Park, its studios are located in Toms River and its transmitter is in Tinton Falls. The station is owned by Townsquare Media.

History
The station In 1926, began life as WCAP (for City of Asbury Park) before it was purchased by the Asbury Park Press and renamed WJLK as a sister station to WJLK-FM, which the newspaper placed on the air on November 20, 1947. The stations emphasized news coverage, using the paper's resources to produce 15-minute newscasts at the top of each hour, and a wide variety of programs including various types of music, talk and interviews.

In 1989, the newspaper sold the two stations to Devlin and Ferrari Broadcasting Company of New York for $12.5 million. The ownership changed again and during the time between the sale by the Press and the present day, various formats were tried, including oldies, big band music and country.

On June 25, 2007, the station (which by then was known as WADB) became a full-time ESPN Deportes Radio affiliate, broadcasting sports programming in Spanish. Six months later, in January 2008, it became a Fox Sports Radio affiliate and adopted the slogan "National Sports with a Shore View." WADB mostly broadcast Fox Sports Radio programming. The station also broadcasts Lakewood BlueClaws minor league baseball along with sister station WOBM.

The station held the WJLK call sign until November 4, 1996, and was called WADB from that date until September 18, 2008. Millennium Radio then renamed the station WBUD before changing the name back to WADB on June 4, 2009.

For most of the period since 1952, the WBUD call letters were used by the radio station at 1260 kHz licensed to Trenton, N.J. Millennium Radio moved the call letters to its Asbury Park AM station when the Trenton operation was sold to a religious broadcaster. According to the Federal Communications Commission database, there is a low-power TV station serving Blairsville, Georgia using the call letters WBUD-LP. The WJLK call letters live on at Millennium's 94.3 FM station licensed to Asbury Park.

The WADB call letters previously belonged to the first station to occupy the FM frequency of 95.9 MHz and licensed to Point Pleasant, N.J. That station was started in the fall of 1968 by the late Adamant Brown of Rumson, N.J. The call letters stand for Adamant and Dorothy Brown (his wife). WADB (FM) featured a "beautiful music" format at its inception with very few deviations from that format until September 1996 when new owners changed the call letters to WRAT and adopted the so-called "active rock" format, which relies heavily on rock music featuring guitars.

On September 3, 2010, WADB changed their format to oldies, simulcasting WOBM 1160 AM. Both stations continue to broadcast Lakewood BlueClaws minor league baseball and play-by-play of high school sports.

On May 19, 2014, WADB changed their format from oldies to news/talk.

On January 3, 2017, WADB changed their format from news/talk to oldies, branded as "Beach Radio".

On February 1, 2022, at 10 a.m., after playing "Thunder Road" by Bruce Springsteen, WADB changed their format from oldies to country, branded as "Cat Country 96.7/104.1", with the first song being "Cold as You" by Luke Combs.

References

External links

FCC History Cards for WADB

ADB
Country radio stations in the United States
Townsquare Media radio stations